Axia vaulogeri is a species of moth of the family Cimeliidae first described by Staudinger in 1892. It is found in North Africa, including Algeria, Morocco and Libya.

The larvae feed on Euphorbia terracina and Euphorbia medicaginea.

References

Moths described in 1892
Cimeliidae